Adha is a village in Daska Tehsil, Sialkot District of the Punjab province of Pakistan.

References

External links
 Adha at maplandia.com

Villages in Sialkot District